The 2015 League of Legends World Championship was an esports tournament for the multiplayer online battle arena video game League of Legends. It was the fifth iteration of the League of Legends World Championship, an annual international tournament organized by the game's developer, Riot Games. It was held from October 1 to 31 in various cities across Europe: the group stages in Le Dock Pullman, in Paris, France; the quarterfinals at the Wembley Arena in London, England, United Kingdom; the semifinals in the Brussels Expo in Brussels, Belgium; and the finals at Mercedes-Benz Arena in Berlin, Germany. The 16 teams qualified by either winning a professional league or a regional qualifying tournament. There was a 16 team round-robin group stage followed by an 8 team single elimination bracket. The games were officially streamed on Twitch, YouTube and Azubu in several languages. The BBC also streamed the tournament online on BBC Three but for British IP addresses only. A peak of around 14 million concurrent viewers watched the finals, according to official sources.

Teams 
The following teams qualified to participate in the tournament's group stage:

Rosters

Venues 
Paris, London, Brussels, Berlin were the four cities chosen to host the competition.

Group stage 
The group stage was played in a best of one double round-robin format, with the top two teams from each of the four groups advancing to the knockout stage, for a total of eight teams. The group stage started on October 1 in Le Dock Pullman, Paris and concluded on October 11.   In Group B, ahq e-Sports Club and Cloud9 both ended in a 3–3 tie, resulting in a tiebreaker won by ahq e-Sports Club to win second place in the group.

Group A

Group B

Group C

Group D

Knockout stage 

The bracket stage started on October 15 in Wembley Arena in London, continued to Brussels Expo in Brussels, and concluded on October 31 with the grand finals hosted in Mercedes-Benz Arena in Berlin. The knockout stage has been streamed on BBC Three, while the final will be streamed on ESPN3. The bracket stage is played in a best of 5 format. In the grand final, SK Telecom T1 beat KOO Tigers 3 to 1, dropping their only game of the whole tournament.

Final standings

Viewership numbers 
The final was expected to have over 30 million people streaming it online. The finals were watched by 36 million people, with a peak concurrent viewership of 14 million viewers.

Controversies

Obscenity incident 
During the final day of the group stage in Paris, Cloud9's Hai "Hai" Lam made an obscene gesture towards an opponent while on stage. Hai was fined €500.

Technical issues 
In game 2 of the quarterfinals between Fnatic and EDward Gaming, an in-game bug occurred to Fnatic's Kim "Reignover" Ui-Jin which prevented the game from continuing, forcing the game to be remade from scratch. EDG lost 0–3 to FNC, but because the remade of game 2, in which FNC had an advantage over EDG, EDG was taunted "lost 0–4 in a BO5" in China. After investigating the issue, Riot Games chose to disable Gragas, the champion Reignover was playing, for the rest of the tournament, along with Lux and Ziggs, champions who were deemed susceptible to the same issue.

Notes

References

External links 

 Official information

League of Legends Wo
League of Legends World Championship, 2015
League of Legends World Championship
2015 multiplayer online battle arena tournaments